Sude may refer to:

People
 Julia Sude (born 1987), German beach volleyball player
 Sude Hacımustafaoğlu (born 2002), Turkish volleyball player
 Sude Nur Sözüdoğru (born 2002), Turkish football player
 Sude Yılmaz (born 2002), Turkish basketball player
 Ulrich Sude (born 1956), German football player
 Zeynep Sude Demirel (born 1996), Turkish volleyball player

Places
 Sude, Ethiopia
 Kleine Sude, part of the Schmaar river, Germany
 Sude (river), Germany